The Georgia National Fair is a state-sponsored fair that is held every October on the Georgia National Fairgrounds and Agricenter in Perry, Georgia, United States. 

The Georgia National Fair is now an 11-day fair. It was first held in 1990 with an attendance of 270,000 people. It has grown to attract an annual average of over 565,500 visitors. It offers a wide range of activities and shows, such as agricultural, livestock and horse shows, home and fine arts competitions, youth organization events (4-H, FBLA, FCCLA, FFA, HOSA and TSA), circus, midway rides and games, fair food, major live music concerts in Reaves Arena, family entertainment, and nightly fireworks.

The Georgia National Fair is the official state-sponsored fair, administered through the Georgia Agricultural Exposition Authority.

The rides have been provided by Reithoffer Shows since 1990.

References

External links

 Georgia National Fair
 Georgia National Fairgrounds and Agricenter

History of Georgia (U.S. state)
Georgia (U.S. state) culture
Annual fairs
State fairs
October events
Fairs in the United States
Tourist attractions in Houston County, Georgia
Festivals in Georgia (U.S. state)
Festivals established in 1990